The men's tournament of the 2015 M&M Meat Shops Canadian Junior Curling Championships will be held from January 24 to February 1 at the Corner Brook Civic Centre and the Corner Brook Curling Club.

Teams
The teams are listed as follows:

Round-robin standings
Final round-robin standings

Round-robin results
All draw times are listed in Newfoundland Standard Time (UTC−3:30).

Pool A

Draw 1
Saturday, January 24, 10:00 am

Draw 2
Saturday, January 24, 2:30 pm

Draw 3
Saturday, January 24, 7:30 pm

Draw 4
Sunday, January 25, 10:00 am

Draw 5
Sunday, January 25, 2:30 pm

Draw 6
Sunday, January 25, 7:00 pm

Draw 7
Monday, January 26, 10:00 am

Draw 9
Monday, January 26, 7:00 pm

Draw 10
Tuesday, January 27, 10:00 am

Draw 11
Tuesday, January 27, 2:30 pm

Pool A Tie-Breaker 1
Tuesday, January 21, 2:30 pm

Pool A Tie-Breaker 2
Wednesday, January 22, 10:00 am

Pool B

Draw 2
Saturday, January 24, 2:30 pm

Draw 3
Saturday, January 24, 7:30 pm

Draw 4
Sunday, January 25, 10:00 pm

Draw 5
Sunday, January 25, 2:30 pm

Draw 6
Sunday, January 25, 7:00 pm

Draw 7
Monday, January 26, 10:00 am

Draw 8
Monday, January 26, 2:30 pm

Draw 9
Monday, January 26, 7:00 pm

Draw 10
Tuesday, January 27, 10:00 am

Draw 11
Tuesday, January 21, 2:30 pm

Pool B Tie-Breaker 1
Tuesday, January 21, 7:00 pm

Pool B Tie-Breaker 2
Wednesday, January 22, 10:00 am

Placement Round

Seeding Pool

Standings
Final round-robin standings

Draw 1
Wednesday, January 28, 2:30 pm

Draw 2
Wednesday, January 28, 7:00 pm

Draw 3
Thursday, January 29, 2:30 pm

Draw 4
Thursday, January 29, 7:00pm

Draw 5
Friday, January 30, 12:30 pm

Championship Pool

Championship Pool Standings
Final round-robin standings

Draw 1
Wednesday, January 28, 10:00am

Draw 2
Wednesday, January 28, 2:30pm

Draw 3
Wednesday, January 28, 7:00pm

Draw 4
Thursday, January 29, 10:00am

Draw 5
Thursday, January 29, 2:30pm

Draw 6
Thursday, January 29, 7:00pm

Draw 7
Friday, January 30, 8:30am

Tie-Breaker 1
Friday, January 30, 1:30pm

Tie-Breaker 2
Saturday, January 31, 1:30pm

Playoffs

Semifinal
Sunday, February 1, 1:30 pm

Final
Sunday, February 1, 8:00 pm

References

External links

Junior Championships
Canadian Junior Curling Championships, 2015
Corner Brook
Canadian Junior Curling Championships